Democratic Coalition (CD) was a Spanish electoral coalition formed in December 1978 to contest the general election the following year, after the approval of the Constitution.

History
In the first weeks, the coalition -after its foundation on 16 December 1978- adopted the names Spanish Democratic Confederation or Progressive Democratic Confederation before changing its name to Democratic Coalition on 9 January 1979.

Alfonso Osorio and José María de Areilza had been ministers in the UCD governments, who resigned from them at different times because of disagreements with President Adolfo Suárez. The presidential candidate of the government was Manuel Fraga.

It won nine seats in the Congress of Deputies, nearly half of its predecessor, People's Alliance, had obtained in the 1977 elections. Given the dismal results, Fraga resigned as leader of the coalition and went solo in front of People's Alliance.

In the case of the 1979 municipal elections, Democratic Coalition withdrew in March of that year their lists of candidates for Madrid, Aviles, Cordoba, Bilbao and other cities.

The parliamentary group of Democratic Coalition continued as such until the 1982 general elections. In that year, People's Alliance formed with other parties a broad coalition that would later be known as the People's Coalition.

Composition
The coalition brought together at the time of the 1979 election to various center-right parties:

 People's Alliance (AP) of Manuel Fraga Iribarne.
 Liberal Citizens Action (ACL) of José María de Areilza
 Progressive Democratic Party (PDProg) of Alfonso Osorio.
 Spanish Renewal (RE)
 People's Party of Catalonia (PPC) of Luis Montal.
 Environmentalist and Social Change
 Action for Ceuta (APC)
 Association of Basque Independent Democrats (DIV)
 Confederation of Conservative Parties.

Electoral performance

Notes

References

Defunct political party alliances in Spain
1978 establishments in Spain
1982 disestablishments in Spain